The 11th New York State Legislature, consisting of the New York State Senate and the New York State Assembly, met from January 9 to March 22, 1788, during the eleventh year of George Clinton's governorship, in Poughkeepsie.

Background
Under the provisions of the New York Constitution of 1777, the State Senators were elected on general tickets in the senatorial districts, and were then divided into four classes. Six senators each drew lots for a term of 1, 2, 3 or 4 years and, beginning at the election in April 1778, every year six Senate seats came up for election to a four-year term. Assemblymen were elected countywide on general tickets to a one-year term, the whole assembly being renewed annually.

In March 1786, the Legislature enacted that future Legislatures meet on the first Tuesday of January of each year unless called earlier by the governor. No general meeting place was determined, leaving it to each Legislature to name the place where to reconvene, and if no place could be agreed upon, the Legislature should meet again where it adjourned.

In 1786, Columbia County was partitioned from Albany County, and 3 of Albany's Assembly seats were apportioned to Columbia.

Elections
The State election was held from April 24 to 26, 1787. Senators Samuel Townsend (Southern D.) and Jacobus Swartwout (Middle D.) were re-elected; and James Duane, John Laurance (both Southern D.), Anthony Hoffman (Middle D.) and Jellis Fonda (Western D.) were also elected to the Senate.

Sessions
The State Legislature was to meet on January 1, 1788, at Poughkeepsie, but the Assembly first had a quorum on January 9, the Senate on January 11; both Houses adjourned on March 22, 1788.

On February 1, 1788, the Legislature passed a resolution for the election of delegates to a Convention to deliberate upon the adoption of the U.S. Constitution. The Convention met from June 17 to July 26, 1788, at Poughkeepsie and ratified the Constitution by a vote of 30 to 27. From this time, the politicians were divided in two political parties: those who voted for the Constitution were henceforth known as Federalists, those who voted against it as Anti-Federalists, or Democratic-Republicans.

State Senate

Districts
The Southern District (9 seats) consisted of Kings, New York, Queens, Richmond, Suffolk and Westchester counties.
The Middle District (6 seats) consisted of Dutchess, Orange and Ulster counties.
The Eastern District (3 seats) consisted of Washington, Columbia, Cumberland and Gloucester counties.
The Western District (6 seats) consisted of Albany and Montgomery counties.

Note: There are now 62 counties in the State of New York. The counties which are not mentioned in this list had not yet been established, or sufficiently organized, the area being included in one or more of the abovementioned counties.

Members
The asterisk (*) denotes members of the previous Legislature who continued in office as members of this Legislature.

Employees
Clerk: Abraham B. Bancker

State Assembly

Districts
The City and County of Albany (7 seats)
Columbia County (3 seats)
Cumberland County (3 seats)
Dutchess County (7 seats)
Gloucester County (2 seats)
Kings County (2 seats)
Montgomery County) (6 seats)
The City and County of New York (9 seats)
Orange County (4 seats)
Queens County (4 seats)
Richmond County (2 seats)
Suffolk County (5 seats)
Ulster County (6 seats)
Washington County (4 seats)
Westchester County (6 seats)

Note: There are now 62 counties in the State of New York. The counties which are not mentioned in this list had not yet been established, or sufficiently organized, the area being included in one or more of the abovementioned counties.

Assemblymen
The asterisk (*) denotes members of the previous Legislature who continued as members of this Legislature.

Employees
Clerk: John McKesson

Notes

Sources
The New York Civil List compiled by Franklin Benjamin Hough (Weed, Parsons and Co., 1858) [see pg. 108 for Senate districts; pg. 113 for senators; pg. 148f for Assembly districts; pg. 164 for assemblymen; pg. 54f for U.S. Constitution ratifying convention]

1787 in New York (state)
1788 in New York (state)
011